Kakugo virus  is a picorna-like virus most commonly found in the brains of worker bees. It is a subtype of the Deformed wing virus. The Kakugo (Japanese for 'ready to attack') virus, when resident in a bee's brain, can contribute to aggressive behaviors similar to those preeminent during a bee's guard phase in their life cycle. Kakugo is the first virus to have been found to cause aggressive behavior, although because the virus was only recently discovered to have such effects, research into the matter is limited.

Analysis 
Kakugo RNA encodes a protein of 2,893 amino acid residues that shares structural features and sequence similarities with various picorna-like virus polyproteins, especially those from sacbrood virus, which infects honeybees. The Kakugo protein contains several domains that correspond to the virion protein, helicase, protease, and RNA-dependent RNA polymerase domains of various picorna-like virus polyproteins.

Aggression 
The increased aggression of infected Apis mellifera in Japan forces the bees to transmit, likely via Varroa. A. mellifera is sometimes known to show increased defence against Vespa mandarinia attacks and it has been suggested that this is due to Kakugo. However, a case was later found in which Kakugo virus infection spread throughout the nest, so it has been criticized that Kakugo virus infection does not influence the aggression of A. mellifera.

References

External links 
from The IUSSI 2006 Congress
Complete Genome

Iflaviridae
Bee diseases